Nenè Nhaga Bissoli (born 10 October 1987) is a Guinea-Bissau-born Italian footballer who plays as a defender. She became a naturalized citizen of Italy in 2008. She has been a member of the Italy women's national team.

Career

Youth player 
Bissoli's football career began at the Libertas Castagnaro team, helping them to win the Veneto Regional Youth Tournament in 1999, playing in defence.

National level 
In February 2008, Bissoli was selected for the Italian Women's Soccer team to play in the forthcoming 2009 quarterfinals for the UEFA Women's Championship, playing against Hungary, Ireland and Romania. In 2009 she joined the national team to play against Armenia on 25 November.

After a period of non-selection, a new manager Antonio Cabrini, met with Bissoli, who was selected to play in 2014 for the Cyprus Cup. Bissoli played in the 2015 qualification matches for the Women's Soccer World Cup.

Bissoli played for Tavagnacco from 2011–14 and has played for Chievo Verona since 2017.

References

External links

1987 births
Living people
Bissau-Guinean women's footballers
People from Cacheu Region
Bissau-Guinean emigrants to Italy
Naturalised citizens of Italy
Italian women's footballers
Italy women's international footballers
Italian sportspeople of African descent
Serie A (women's football) players
U.P.C. Tavagnacco players
Women's association football defenders